WBTX is a Southern Gospel formatted broadcast radio station licensed to Broadway-Timberville, Virginia, serving Northern Rockingham County and Southern Shenandoah County in Virginia.  WBTX is owned and operated by WBTX Radio, LLC.

Translator
In addition to the main station, WBTX is relayed by an FM translator to widen its broadcast area.

References

External links
 AM1470 WBTX Online

1972 establishments in Virginia
Southern Gospel radio stations in the United States
Radio stations established in 1972
Timberville, Virginia
BTX